Ahmed Darwish (Arabic:أحمد درويش) (born 29 September 2000) is an Emirati professional footballer who plays as a defender for Al-Nasr.

Career
Ahmed Darwish started his career at Al-Fujairah and is a product of the Al-Fujairah's youth system. On 20 September 2019, Ahmed Darwish made his professional debut for Al-Fujairah against Al-Wahda in the Pro League .

Career statistics

Club

References

External links
 

2000 births
Living people
Emirati footballers
Fujairah FC players
Al-Nasr SC (Dubai) players
UAE Pro League players
UAE First Division League players
Association football defenders
Place of birth missing (living people)